List of bicycles may refer to:

List of bicycle types
List of bicycle brands and manufacturing companies

See also
Outline of cycling

Cycling-related lists